C. Doyle Steele (October 26, 1921 – December 19, 1999) was a Democratic member of the Pennsylvania General Assembly.

He married his wife Dianne in 1955.  His parents were Cyrus S. and Sarah Bowman Steele.

Steele practiced law in Apollo, Pennsylvania from 1953 until 1999, after serving in the U.S. Navy during World War II. A graduate of Temple University in Philadelphia, Doyle was elected burgess of Apollo in 1954, serving two consecutive terms until 1961. From 1967 to 1971, he served in the Pennsylvania House of Representatives.

References

Democratic Party members of the Pennsylvania House of Representatives
1921 births
1999 deaths
20th-century American politicians
People from Armstrong County, Pennsylvania
United States Navy personnel of World War II